Rekia Ziadi (born 8 February 1986) is an Algerian team handball player. She plays for the club Saida, and on the Algerian national team. She competed at the 2013 World Women's Handball Championship in Serbia, where Algeria placed 22nd.

References

1986 births
Living people
Algerian female handball players
21st-century Algerian people